Edward J. Early Jr. is an American lawyer and politician who served as mayor of Lowell, Massachusetts, state representative, and Middlesex Northern Register of Deeds.

Early life
Early was born on July 23, 1931 in Lowell. He attended the Keith Academy, Boston College, and Suffolk University Law School.

Political career
Early began his political career as a member of the Lowell city council. From 1966 to 1967, he also served as Mayor, a ceremonial position as the city has is administrated by a professional city manager. From 1973 to 1977, Early was a member of the Massachusetts House of Representatives. In 1976 he was elected Register of Deeds for the Middlesex Northern district. He was reelected without opposition in 1982 and 1988.

References

1931 births
Boston College alumni
Massachusetts lawyers
Mayors of Lowell, Massachusetts
Democratic Party members of the Massachusetts House of Representatives
Registers of deeds in Massachusetts
Suffolk University Law School alumni
Living people